Donald Roland "D.J." Trahan, Jr. (born December 18, 1980) is an American professional golfer.

Early life

Trahan was born in Atlanta, Georgia, the son of Don Trahan. Shortly after being born his parents moved to Hilton Head Island, South Carolina where he spent his younger years playing at Harbour Town Golf Links and where he attended Hilton Head Island High School. He then moved to Spartanburg, South Carolina where he attended and graduated from Paul M. Dorman High School, playing both golf and baseball. He attended Clemson University. He won the U.S. Amateur Public Links in 2000 and represented the United States in the 2001 Walker Cup and the 2002 Eisenhower Trophy.

Professional career
After turning professional in 2003, Trahan spent 2004 on the Nationwide Tour winning the final full-field event of that season at the Miccosukee Championship. He was a PGA Tour rookie in 2005 and won his first PGA Tour title at the 2006 Southern Farm Bureau Classic which was an alternate event to the WGC-American Express Championship. He won his second event at the Bob Hope Chrysler Classic by three strokes over Justin Leonard on January 20, 2008. He has featured in the top 100 of the Official World Golf Rankings.

Amateur wins
2000 U.S. Amateur Public Links
2001 Jones Cup Invitational, South Carolina Amateur
2002 Azalea Invitational, Monroe Invitational, South Carolina Amateur

Collegiate wins
2000 Las Vegas Intercollegiate
2001 Carpet Classic, Jerry Pate Invitational
2002 NCAA East Regional
2003 Mercedes-Benz Intercollegiate

Collegiate Honors
All-ACC: 1st Team (2000–2003)
ACC Freshman of the Year: 2000
ACC Player of the Year: 2002
All-American: 2000 (Honorable Mention, 1st Team Freshman), 2001 (Honorable Mention), 2002 (1st Team), 2003 (1st Team)
Ben Hogan Award: 2002
Jack Nicklaus Award: 2002
ACC 50-Year Anniversary Golf Team: 2002 (only active collegiate golfer named to the list)
Carolinas Golf Association Player of the Year: 2000-2002

During Trahan's collegiate career, Clemson won two ACC titles (2000, 2003), three NCAA East Region titles (2000, 2002, 2003), and the 2003 NCAA Division I Championship. The 2001 team was national runner-up and the 2002 team came in third place at nationals.

Professional wins (3)

PGA Tour wins (2)

PGA Tour playoff record (1–0)

Nationwide Tour wins (1)

Results in major championships

CUT = missed the half-way cut
"T" = tied

Results in The Players Championship

CUT = missed the halfway cut
DQ = disqualified
"T" indicates a tie for a place

Results in World Golf Championships

"T" = Tied
Note that the HSBC Champions did not become a WGC event until 2009.

U.S. national team appearances
Amateur
Walker Cup: 2001
Eisenhower Trophy: 2002 (winners)
Palmer Cup: 2002 (winners)

See also
2004 PGA Tour Qualifying School graduates
2019 Korn Ferry Tour Finals graduates

References

External links

American male golfers
Clemson Tigers men's golfers
PGA Tour golfers
Korn Ferry Tour graduates
Golfers from Atlanta
Golfers from South Carolina
People from Mount Pleasant, South Carolina
1980 births
Living people